Parliamentary elections were held in Finland on 18 March 2007. Early voting was possible from the 7–13 March. The 200 members of the Eduskunta were elected from 15 constituencies.

Election themes included a reduction of income tax and VAT on food. A proposal for a guaranteed minimum income was introduced by some parties.  The election debates were characterised by the high economic growth in Finland in recent years, which was thought to mean the government would have extra money to use on welfare services and transfer payments. Largest advertising budgets were spent by the Coalition Party (€2.46M) and the Center Party (€2.48M) with SDP far behind (€1.37M).

Altogether, 2,004 candidates were nominated, 799 of whom were women. About three-quarters of the candidates were nominated by parties currently represented in Parliament. The number of female MPs rose as 84 women were elected (formerly 75), now comprising a record 42% of the 200 MPs.

According to the newspaper Helsingin Sanomat, the number of advance voters rose in comparison with the previous election in 2003. After the Tuesday before the Sunday election, when advance voting ended, the voter turnout had already reached 29.2%, which was more than at the same point in the 2003 elections. However, total voter turnout, at 67.8%, fell short of the 2003 figure, 69.7%, reaching a new low since the 1939 elections.

Many prominent MPs decided not to stand in the election. Former Prime Minister (1995–2003) and Speaker of the outgoing Parliament, Paavo Lipponen left his seat, as did the fifth-longest serving minister of all time, Jan-Erik Enestam, and former Left Alliance party leader Suvi-Anne Siimes, who had harshly criticized her party after her resignation as chairman in 2006. Some former MPs made a comeback, former Finance Minister and presidential candidate Sauli Niinistö and the first European Green minister, Pekka Haavisto, former minister and National Coalition chairman Pertti Salolainen, former foreign minister Paavo Väyrynen and rock musician Pertti "Veltto" Virtanen being the most famous examples. Niinistö also set a record for the highest number of personal votes, 60,498, which is almost twice as high as the previous record, and with the application of the d'Hondt method used in Finland, as many as four other National Coalition candidates were elected to Parliament on the strength of these votes.

The date of the election was near to the 100th anniversary of the first Finnish parliamentary elections, which were held on 15–16 March 1907, and were the first elections held under universal suffrage in Europe.

Electoral system
Some constituencies elect only six or seven MPs, resulting in a high election threshold for a given party, favouring large parties and reducing the proportionality of the result. Because of this, the party leader of the Greens, Tarja Cronberg, lost her seat in the district of Northern Karelia, the party's only one, despite their getting 11.7% of the vote there. Her case, made seemingly even more unfair by her impressive personal total of 7,802 votes, greater than that of most of those elected, has been held up in the media as a symbol of the flaws in the present system. The constituencies of 2007 were mostly based on the old provinces; the largest difference was counting Helsinki as a separate district. The case has sparked a multi-party initiative that could result in a reform, to become effective in the 2015 parliamentary elections at the earliest.

Results

The elections were a major victory for the opposition National Coalition Party under Jyrki Katainen. It gained ten seats and became the second-largest party in Finland. The main government partners, the Centre Party and the Social Democrats, both lost ground. With the Left Alliance also losing seats, the labour parties received the worst result in the 100-year history of Finnish democracy; for the Social Democrats, the result was the worst since 1962, while the Left Alliance has lost seats in both elections held since 1999. The Centre Party, despite the loss, maintained its position as the biggest party in Parliament, with one seat more than the National Coalition. It was also the only time, except for the parliamentary election of 1930, that the Centre Party and the National Coalition Party together have an absolute majority in Parliament. The outcome led to the formation of a new center-right government and the left-leaning Social Democrats were left out in opposition for the first time since 1995.

Winners also include the True Finns, who gained two seats. Party leader Timo Soini in particular took in a massive personal total of almost 20,000 votes, the third greatest in the country. The Green League gained one seat with its best ever showing in parliamentary elections, but party leader Tarja Cronberg lost her seat in the small district of Northern Karelia. The Swedish People's Party gained one seat as well, although losing votes compared to the 2003 elections.

Incumbent Prime Minister Matti Vanhanen, as party leader of the Centre Party, formed a new government with Centre Party, National Coalition, the Greens and Swedish People's Party. These parties have 125 seats out of 200 in the parliament. The government coalition is centre-right and calls itself "blue-green government" after the blue colour of National Coalition and the green colours of Centre and the Greens.

The election was a major defeat (8 seats lost, 15% fewer won than in 2003) for the Social Democrats, and sparked an internal investigation. The party conducted a campaign that had a simplistic anti-Conservative message. Meanwhile, the trade union SAK, strongly associated with SDP, conducted a similar anti-Conservative campaign. The association between the two organizations was abundantly clear, as the SDP's chairman Eero Heinäluoma was a former SAK director. The campaigns failed spectacularly, and according to the internal investigation, the attempt to challenge the Conservatives was a failure. One TV commercial, which showed a capitalist devouring a meal and laughing how "workers do not vote", drew widely publicized criticism even before its launch, when the TV commercial was shown in news (and on YouTube). The SDP's internal investigation also pointed out that the party's campaign promises had poor credibility, since the SDP had been in the government for years but (at least perceivably) had not delivered on them. For example, the SDP chairman Eero Heinäluoma had prevented a rise in the student benefit.

As many as eight very small parties were removed from the registry of political parties as a result of their repeated failure to gain seats in the 2003 and 2007 elections: Suomen työväenpuolue (Workers Party), Independence Party, Liberaalit, Forces for Change in Finland, For the Poor, Yhteisvastuu puolue ("Common Responsibility Party"), Suomen Isänmaallinen Kansallis-Liitto (named after IKL, or Isänmaallinen kansanliike, an organization banned in 1944) and Finnish People's Blue-Whites. Currently, there are three parties in the registry that failed to gain seats in the 2007 elections: Communist Party of Finland, Suomen Senioripuolue (a pensioners' party) and For Peace and Socialism - Communist Workers Party. The removal is not punitive, however, as these parties are allowed register themselves again.

After the Finnish Parliamentary elections on 18 March 2007, the seats were divided among eight parties as follows:

By province

References

External links
Ministry of Justice election site (in English)
History of Finnish Parliament (in English)
Centenary of women's full political rights in Finland (in English)
Election site of the Finnish Broadcasting Company (YLE) (in English)
Finland getting centre-right government with a shade of green -Helsingin Sanomat
Would you vote for someone with a face like yours? -Reuters
Political campaigning to continue on election day -Helsingin Sanomat
Advance voting for Parliamentary Elections begins today -Helsingin Sanomat
Poll: Centre Party leads in advance of Sunday election -Helsingin Sanomat
Poll: Centre-SDP government overwhelming favourite -Helsingin Sanomat
Finnish MP seeks votes in Klingon -Reuters
 NSD: European Election Database - Finland publishes regional level election data; allows for comparisons of election results, 1991–2007

General elections in Finland
Finland
Parliament
Finland
Election and referendum articles with incomplete results